William S. Bowman (December 1822 – June 17, 1901) was an American politician and engineer from Maryland. He served as a member of the Maryland House of Delegates, representing Harford County from 1888 to 1890.

Early life
William S. Bowman was born in December 1822.

Career
Bowman worked as a civil engineer with the Baltimore and Ohio Railroad.

In 1860, Bowman was elected county supervisor of Harford County. He served in that role for ten years.

Bowman was a Democrat. He served as a member of the Maryland House of Delegates, representing Harford County from 1888 to 1890.

Personal life
Bowman married Mary Bailey in 1846. They had at least five children, Mary E., John H., George W., W. S. and Charles C. His wife died in 1894.

Bowman died on June 17, 1901, at his home near Level, Maryland. He was buried at Rock Run Cemetery.

References

1822 births
1901 deaths
People from Harford County, Maryland
Democratic Party members of the Maryland House of Delegates
American railway civil engineers
Baltimore and Ohio Railroad people